La mujer de Lorenzo (Lorenzo's Wife) is a 2003 telenovela produced by Venezuelan production company Venevisión in conjunction with Peruvian production company Iguana Producciones. Venezuelan actor Guillermo Pérez and Mexican actress Adriana Louvier star as the main protagonists while Carolina Tejera, Yul Bürkle, and Andrea Montenegro star as the main antagonists.

Plot
In everyone's eyes, Laurita and Lorenzo have what everyone considers to be the perfect marriage. Lorenzo is a handsome, rich and well educated man running his own fashion house while Laurita is beautiful and elegant: the ideal woman for a man like him.

However, the truth is that Laurita is bored with her marriage, and she begins an affair with Alex (Yul Bürkle) a shameless and attractive opportunist who seduces rich women through his job as a personal trainer. Laurita is convinced that she is in love with Alex, and she makes the difficult decision of leaving Lorenzo. But her lawyer reminds her that the pre-nuptial agreement she signed will leave her penniless if she files for a divorce. Not willing to give up the luxurious life she is accustomed to, she hatches out a plan to make Lorenzo fall in love with another woman. The perfect candidate is Silvia, a pretty, simple and sweet young woman working as Lorenzo's assistance. Through the help of her Giacomo, her designer friend, she befriends Silvia and slowly transforms her into the type of woman that Lorenzo can fall in love with.

After spending time with each other, Lorenzo and Sylvia begin to fall in love with each other. But things aren't that simple, since Silvia is in love with Alex who has been her boyfriend for years. Furthermore, Isabela, Lorenzo's former fiancee, arrives from abroad with intentions of taking over Lorenzo's company as an act of revenge against Lorenzo and Laurita. Along the way, Alex also becomes Isabela's lover and Silvia and Lorenzo finally admit their love for each other. Seeing that she is about to lose everything, Laurita changes her mind and starts her plan to recover Lorenzo's love. Which among the three women will win in the end?

Cast
 Adriana Louvier as Silvia Estevez
 Guillermo Pérez as Lorenzo Valezuela
 Carolina Tejera as Laurita Benavides Valezuela
 Andrea Montenegro as Isabela Fergoni
 Yul Bürkle as Alex Zambrano
 Milene Vásquez as Natalia "Nati"
 Camucha Negrete as Emparatriz Negrete
 Eduardo Cesti as Conan
 José Luis Ruiz as Giacomo Volicelli
 Leslie Stewart
 Xavier Pimentel
 Oscar Beltrán
 Ximena Diaz
 Elizabeth Córdova
 Javier Lobatón
 María Fe Fuentes

References

External links

2003 telenovelas
Venevisión telenovelas
Venezuelan telenovelas
2003 Venezuelan television series debuts
2003 Venezuelan television series endings
Peruvian telenovelas
2003 Peruvian television series debuts
2003 Peruvian television series endings
Spanish-language telenovelas
Television shows set in Peru